Death-associated protein 1 is a protein that in humans is encoded by the DAP gene.

DAP gene encodes a basic,  proline-rich,  15-kD  protein.  Death-associated protein acts as a positive mediator of  programmed cell death  that is induced by interferon-gamma.

References

Further reading